The Lives of Benjamin Franklin is a 1974 American television miniseries that chronicles the life of Benjamin Franklin.

The series was broadcast by CBS and won five Emmy Awards, including the award for Outstanding Limited Series.  Howard Fast won the Emmy for Outstanding Writing for a Drama Series for the first installment (The Ambassador).  Glenn Jordan was also nominated for Outstanding Directing for a Drama Series for The Ambassador episode, and Loring Mandel was nominated for Outstanding Writing for a Drama Series for The Whirlwind episode.

The four 90-minute episodes debuted on November 21 and December 17, 1974, and January 9 and 28, 1975.

Cast
 Willie Aames as Franklin at age 12
 Beau Bridges  as Franklin the young man
 Eddie Albert as Franklin the diplomat
 Richard Widmark  as Franklin the rebel
 Melvyn Douglas  as Franklin the elder statesman

References

External links 
 
  Charles Lisanby on designing the sets for the miniseries Benjamin Franklin (video), televisionacademy.com

1974 television films
1974 films
American biographical series
American television docudramas
1970s American television miniseries
Peabody Award-winning television programs
Primetime Emmy Award for Outstanding Miniseries winners
1974 drama films
Television series about the American Revolution
Works about Benjamin Franklin
Cultural depictions of Benjamin Franklin
Films directed by Glenn Jordan
1970s English-language films